Aoife-Grace Moore is an Irish journalist and political correspondent, from Derry. Based in the Republic of Ireland, she is best known for breaking the Oireachtas Golf Society scandal, "Golfgate", story with Paul Hosford for the Irish Examiner in 2020.

Background
A Derry native, Moore is the niece of Bloody Sunday victim Patrick Doherty. She is a graduate of Glasgow Caledonian University.

Career
Moore has worked for Press Association, and the Irish Examiner.

While working for the Examiner, Moore was the target of tweets as part of the Eoghan Harris Twitter scandal, and has been the subject of workplace sexual harassment.

She has been commissioned to write a non-fiction book about Sinn Féin for Sandycove publishing.

Golfgate
Una Mullally described Moore and Hosford's Golfgate coverage as the "scoop of the year", and they shared the NewsBrands Ireland "Journalist of the Year Award".

References

External links

Writers from Derry (city)
Journalists from Northern Ireland
21st-century women writers from Northern Ireland
Irish women journalists
Living people
1991 births
Date of birth missing (living people)
Alumni of Glasgow Caledonian University